A lotus seed bun is a Chinese sweet bun found in China. They are prepared by steaming a yeast-leavened dough that contains lotus seed paste. It can be classified as a dim sum, though not exclusively so.

Preparation
Because the bun has a variety of different appearances, the dough especially, can be different depending on where it is made. The dough is generally made of similar substances like the ones used in char siu baau.

See also
 Jjinppang
 Longevity peach
 List of buns
 List of steamed foods

References

Dim sum
Sweet breads
Chinese bakery products
Steamed buns